The Santa Ynez Band of Chumash Mission Indians is a federally recognized tribe of Chumash, an indigenous people of California, in Santa Barbara. Their name for themselves is Samala. The locality of Santa Ynez is referred to as ’alaxulapu in Chumashan language.

Government
The Santa Ynez Band is headquartered in Santa Ynez, California. They are governed by a democratically elected, five-member tribal council. Their current tribal administration is as follows:
 Chairman: Kenneth Kahn
 Vice-chairman: Mike Lopez
 Secretary/Treasurer: Maxine Littlejohn
 Business Committee Member: Gary Pace
 Business Committee Member: Raul Armenta

Reservation
The Santa Ynez Indian Reservation is the only Chumash reservation. It was 127-acres large and was established on 27 December 1901. Beginning in 1979, the tribe established a housing program and began improving the infrastructure on the reservation.

Samala Chumash language 
The last native speaker of the Samala Chumash language, also called Ineseño, died in 1965. Verbal inheritance was lost with the death of the last native speaker. The language was revived through documents and archives, which created a sense of pride between modern Chumash descendants. 

In the early 1900s linguist/ethnographer John P. Harrington worked with Maria Solares, one of the last fluent speakers of Samala. He created manuscripts containing information on Chumash language, culture, and traditions. Dr. Richard Applegate, who received a PhD in linguistics from U.C. Berkeley, used these manuscripts to write an extensive grammar of Samala and compile a dictionary of the language, which was released in 2008. Dr. Applegate and Nakia Zavalla, the Cultural Director for the Santa Ynez Band of Chumash and a direct descendant of Maria Solares, have begun an effort to revitalize the language. Applegate began teaching Samala in 2003, and Zavalla has spearheaded an immersion-based language apprentice program. As of 2008, Applegate had five language apprentices; however, none had yet reached full fluency.

An online Samala Chumash tutorial is available.

Economic development
The Santa Ynez Band owns and operates the Chumash Casino Resort, as well as the Chumash Cafe, the Creekside Buffet, The Willows restaurant, and Root 246, (formerly the third largest employer in Solvang, 105, until its closure in 2021) all in Santa Ynez, California.

Education

The reservation is served by the College Elementary School District and Santa Ynez Valley Union High School District.

Notes

References
 Pritzker, Barry M. A Native American Encyclopedia: History, Culture, and Peoples. Oxford: Oxford University Press, 2000.

External links

Native American tribes in California
Federally recognized tribes in the United States
Organizations based in Santa Barbara County, California
Santa Ynez Valley
Native American language revitalization